ANAS High Technologies Park was established on the campus of the Azerbaijan National Academy of Sciences in accordance with the presidential order dated November 8, 2016. The main target of the establishment of the HTP is the provision of sustainable economic development through the application of modern technologies and scientific research.

High Technologies Park creates convenient conditions for the development of different economic fields and businesses, such as industry, service, and agriculture, by possessing various technical and material resources. At the same time, it conducts scientific investigations and applies their results to the economy. Technologies Park provides service in the territory of 25.6 ha. There are both a High Technology Park Industry Center and a Business Incubation Center in Baku.

Targets of the ANAS HTP 
There are a number of targets approved by the National Academy of Sciences in order to increase the economy through innovation.

 applying scientific research and innovation systems in business in order to reduce oil and gas dependence in the economy.
 encouraging scientific investigations, innovation, and commercialization of innovative products in Azerbaijan.
 Developing the economic system in the country through the exchange of innovative experiences with different countries
 establishing an innovation-based community.

Main purpose 
By expanding innovation and high technology areas based on contemporary scientific and technological achievements, conducting scientific research, and developing cutting-edge complexes for the development of new technologies, HT Park's primary goal is to further increase state support for sustainable economic development and competitiveness in the nation..

Activity Directions 
Since its founding, the High Technologies Park of ANAS has supported the development of innovative entrepreneurship by fostering technological innovation in our nation, raising the number of new social projects, and, most significantly, commercializing research. 

HT Park, which creates scientific, competitive, and innovative products and is directly involved in the commercialization of science in Azerbaijan, forges connections with the business community to launch cutting-edge ventures. 

The park also works on creative business concepts with universities and emerging entrepreneurs.

Today, HT Park effectively develops and advances new, cutting-edge technologies by relying on contemporary scientific and technological advancements. This company works with our scientists who are working overseas as well as in Azerbaijan. In order to keep up with the most recent advancements in innovation and technology, the park also maintains close communication with techno parks in other nations.

The structure of the High Technologies

Supervisory Board 
The Supervisory Board consists of the chairman, members, and corresponding members, including Misir Mardanov, Aminaga Sadigov, and Fatali Abdullayev. The chairman of the board is Akif Alizadeh, who is the president of the Azerbaijan National Academy of Sciences. Dilgam Taghiyev is the head of the HTP. Members of the board are appointed by ANAS for a period of five years. The head of the board may not be a member of the board and is selected by the board members. Regular and extraordinary meetings are organised by the chairman. Basically, regular meetings held at least once in three months. Extraordinary meetings could be called by the chairman at the request of the board members. During the voting process there are not allowed board members to stay neutral. Decisions are made by an ordinary majority of votes. The vote of the chairman is considered conclusive in situations of equality in the number of votes. At the same time, an auditor is appointed in the company who carries out audit management based on the standards of the international internal audit and country’s law on Internal Audit.

The board of experts 
The board of experts carries out the main supportive function for the projects and residents applying for registration in the technology park. Thus, it was set up in order to evaluate projects of innovation and high technologies and preparation of proposals for the applications.

The chairman of the board is Ibrahim Guliyev, who is the vice president of ANAS. There are also members of the board: Telman Aliyev, Vagif Farzaliyev, Emil Mammadov, Bagir Suleymanov, Yagub Hasanov, and Elshan Hashimov. They are responsible for providing references for the innovation projects, technologies, and scientific results in order to make feasible the production and application of innovative products. The board of experts makes suggestions to the scientific and educational institutions in favour of improvements in the technology park and involves specialised professionals for the examination of innovation projects. In order to evaluate the efficiency of the innovative works, board reviews the opinions of the external professionals and specialized agencies and holds meetings with applicants. The decisions regarding to the assessment of the projects are accepted within the board meetings. Meetings of the board take place when the innovation projects are presented, as well as when it is necessary to execute the functions of the expert board. During the meetings, all decisions are made by a simple majority of votes. The vote of the chairman plays a decisive role if the votes are divided equally.

Residents of the HT Park

ANAS Practical Industry Plant 
The industry plant was established in 1974 and produces a number of oils. This is the first experimental facility in Azerbaijan. The main directions of the plant are setting up direct links between science and industry and applying new technological processes in practice. Approximately seventy varieties of products (mainly lubricants and additives) are produced in the plant for both internal and external markets. However, there is produced Naphtali oil, which is considered as a beneficial for human health.[1]

Millers Oil Azerbaijan LLC 
Miller's Oil Azerbaijan produces lubricants from ready-made products imported from the United Kingdom and works with local partners. Production of engine oils for commercial vehicles, industrial lubricants, anti-corrosion, hydraulic, and gearbox oils are the main activity areas of the plant. At the same time, it produces lubricants for cars. [2] [3]

Science and Technology Park LLC 
It was established in 2016 according to the decision of ANAS and carries out scientific research and experimental-design works for the improvement of innovative products and technologies, creating suitable conditions for their application in the fields of service and industry. [4]

AGRO Bio Eco Tech LLC 
Over the past 25 years, the company has been engaged in the production of organic food products in the agricultural market of Azerbaijan. Since 2000, there have been efforts to produce organomineral additives and biodrugs for agricultural use. However, a number of subsidiaries of the company are operating in foreign countries such as Russia, Turkey, Latvia, Hungary, and Germany. The application of bacterial drugs in Germany and Hungary has increased the productivity of biogas plants. The products of the company are applied in almost all growing lawns of the country and awarded by European Standards Conformity Certificates (IMO – Switzerland, Biocontrol.hu – Hungary and KİWA BCS Ko - Guarantee GmbH – Germany).

EPC Group LLC 
EPC Group LLC was established in 2015. The company assembles Kiyazco, Caspian Refractory, Time Inter Engineering Group, Aztermoizol, Heilig Energy, FSS Company, and Scientific Production Center. The main activity area of the EPC Group is the projection of technologies in the fields of design-build, oil and gas, petrochemicals, and mining. Regarding the cooperation agreement signed with HT Parks in 2017, EPC Group will implement high technologies and innovation in industry, service, and other fields based on the patents of Azerbaijani scientists. The company participated in the creation of the modern construction and engineering management systems for the Gadabay Gold Mining and Metanol plants in Azerbaijan.

DN Technologies LLC 
DN Technologies was established in 2012 and carries out the production and sale of software and technologically oriented products. The main activity areas are 3D modelling and robot technologies. "Virtual Training Shot Simulator" was the first product released by DN Technologies in 2017 designed for different types of firearms in 2017.

Azeltech LLC 
This company produces radiation detector devices.

Alximik LLC 
The company produces detergents and chemistry products by using high technology

References 

Science and technology in Azerbaijan